Blanford's rock agama (Psammophilus blanfordanus) is species of lizard in the family Agamidae. The species is endemic to Peninsular India. One of two species in the genus, P. blanfordanus is found mainly to the east of the distribution of P. dorsalis. Unlike the other species, the male P. blanfordanus in breeding season has the red body color restricted to the head and lacks the broad dorsal stripe.

Etymology
Both the specific name, blanfordanus, and the common name, Blanford's rock agama, are in honor of English naturalist William Thomas Blanford (1832–1905), member of the Geological Survey of India.

Description

Although very similar to P. dorsalis, a specimen of P. blanfordanus can be separated by several features.  P. blanfordanus has a deeper fold on the front of the humerus. The scales on the body are a little larger, and number from 80 to 100 round the middle of the body. The dorsal scales appear keeled and imbricated. When the hind leg is stretched forward and held along the body, it reaches the eye or extends beyond it. Often, a small spine is found behind the edge of the brow-ridge of the eye, and a few enlarged scales are scattered on the sides. Young lizards are olive-brown above, spotted or marbled with brown very similar to the female, but often have a series of large, lozenge-shaped, dark brown spots with pale centres on the back and tail. The adult male is much like P. dorsalis, but in the summer breeding season, the head and anterior part of the body of the males become scarlet or red while the posterior parts are nearly black.

P. blanfordanus is found mainly on rocks. The male displays by head nodding.

Females are slightly smaller than males.

Behaviour
P. blanfordanus spends most of its time resting or basking under the sun. Excess heat causes it to rest inside water holes to decrease overall body temperature.

Diet
The diet of P. blanfordanus consists of insects.

Reproduction
P. blanfordanus is oviparous.

Distribution

References

Further reading
Boulenger GA (1885). Catalogue of the Lizards in the British Museum (Natural History). Second Edition. Volume I. ... Agamidæ. London: Trustees of the British Museum (Natural History). (Taylor and Francis, printers). xii + 436 pp. + Plates I-XXXII. ("Charasia blanfordiana [sic]", pp. 333–334).
Boulenger GA (1890). The Fauna of British India, Including Ceylon and Burma. Reptilia and Batrachia. London: Secretary of State for India in Council. (Taylor and Francis, printers). xviii + 541 pp. ("Charasia blanfordiana [sic]", p. 145).

External links

Psammophilus
Reptiles of India
Reptiles described in 1871
Taxa named by Ferdinand Stoliczka